"You Can't Get What You Want (Till You Know What You Want)" is a single from Joe Jackson's 1984 album Body and Soul.

Glide Magazine ranked the song as Jackson's third best song. Mike DeGagne of AllMusic called the song "explosive."

In addition to the 7” single, it was also released as a 12” single, remixed by John "Jellybean" Benitez.

Background
The track features a slap bass performance from Jackson's longtime bassist Graham Maby. Maby recalled, "For 'You Can't Get What You Want,' on Body and Soul, Joe wanted me to slap. It was certainly not one of my strengths, but I think the track came out fine, and it was fun to play live."

Charts

References

External links
 You Can't Get What You Want (Till You Know What You Want) at Allmusic.com

Joe Jackson (musician) songs
Songs written by Joe Jackson (musician)
1984 singles
1984 songs
A&M Records singles
Song recordings produced by David Kershenbaum